Edward Hollows Marcroft (13 April 1910 – 1975) was an English professional footballer. During his career he played for several Football League clubs.

Career
Marcroft began his career playing in the Lancashire League for Bacup Borough and Great Harwood where his performances prompted First Division side Middlesbrough to sign him for £200. He made a goalscoring debut in January 1932, earning his side a point in a 1–1 draw with Sheffield Wednesday, but never played another senior game for the club before joining Queens Park Rangers in May 1932. 

In 1933, he joined Third Division South side Cardiff City in a swap deal that saw George Emmerson move the other way. He featured heavily for the first team, making 28 league appearances during the 1933–34 season, but was released at the end of the campaign. He returned north, playing for Accrington Stanley, Bacup Borough and Rochdale before joining Macclesfield Town in August 1937. In two seasons, he played over 60 league games for Macclesfield before his career was ended by the outbreak of World War II.

References

1910 births
1975 deaths
English footballers
Bacup Borough F.C. players
Great Harwood F.C. players
Middlesbrough F.C. players
Queens Park Rangers F.C. players
Cardiff City F.C. players
Accrington Stanley F.C. players
Rochdale A.F.C. players
Macclesfield Town F.C. players
English Football League players
Association football wingers